MAXIM Australia is the Australian edition of the United States-based international monthly men's magazine MAXIM. It is known for its pictorials featuring popular actresses, singers, and female models. Largely covering men's lifestyle topics and popular culture, MAXIM is currently the only monthly men's magazine title in Australia.

History and profile
Following the closure of Ralph and Alpha, Australian MAXIM was launched by Nuclear Media under editor-in-chief Santi Pintado, former editor of Ralph. The first issue was published in August 2011 featuring Jennifer Hawkins on the cover. The magazine is based in Sydney.

MAXIM TV
In 2014, the series MAXIM TV launched on ONE HD based on the men's magazine, hosted by James Kerley and Lana Kington.  A second season hosted by Kerley and Kristy Hocking began in 2018 on 7mate.

MAXIM Australia HOT 100
Each year since 2012, the Australian edition of MAXIM has released the MAXIM HOT 100. The winners and their corresponding ages and the year in which the magazine was released are listed below.

References

External links

2006 establishments in Australia
Men's magazines published in Australia
Monthly magazines published in Australia
Magazines established in 2006
Magazines published in Sydney
Men's fashion magazines